The Cannon Balls is a mountain ridge located in Grafton County, New Hampshire. It is part of the Kinsman Range of the White Mountains.  The ridge has three peaks with elevations of, from west to east, 3,693, 3,660, and 3,769 feet (1,125, 1,115 and 1,148 meters). The ridge takes its name from adjacent Cannon Mountain, on which a series of boulders, when viewed from the foot of the mountain, resemble an antique artillery cannon. The Cannon Balls are flanked to the northeast by Cannon Mountain, and to the southwest by Kinsman Mountain.

The south side of the ridge drains into Cascade Brook, thence into the Pemigewasset River, the Merrimack River, and into the Gulf of Maine in Massachusetts. The north side drains into Coppermine Brook, thence into the Ham Branch of the Gale River, the Gale River, Ammonoosuc River, Connecticut River, and into Long Island Sound in Connecticut.

The Appalachian Trail, a  National Scenic Trail from Georgia to Maine, runs across the southern base of the Cannon Balls between North Kinsman and Franconia Notch.

See also 

 List of mountains in New Hampshire
 White Mountain National Forest
 New England Hundred Highest

Notes

External links 
  
  PeakBagger.com: The Cannon Balls
  summitpost.org: Northeast Cannonball

Mountains of New Hampshire
Mountains of Grafton County, New Hampshire
New England Hundred Highest